Saint-Priest-en-Jarez is a commune in the Loire department in central France.

Population

Personalities
Faouzi Ghoulam (born 1991), footballer

See also
Communes of the Loire department

References

Communes of Loire (department)